Luigi Cantone (July 21, 1917 – November 6, 1997) was an Italian fencer and Olympic champion in épée competition.

He received a gold medal in épée individual at the 1948 Summer Olympics in London. He received a silver medal in épée team.

References

1917 births
1997 deaths
Italian male fencers
Olympic fencers of Italy
Fencers at the 1948 Summer Olympics
Olympic gold medalists for Italy
Olympic silver medalists for Italy
Olympic medalists in fencing
Medalists at the 1948 Summer Olympics
People from Robbio
Sportspeople from the Province of Pavia